GlobeAsia Magazine is an Indonesian business magazine and website that was established in 2007. Its founder and editor-in-chief is Shoeb Kagda. The magazine is part of the Lippo Group and BeritaSatu Media Holdings.

GlobeAsia Magazine is the first English-language business magazine of Indonesia. Similar to Forbes magazine, it distributes its own lists of Indonesia's wealthiest people, Indonesia's biggest companies, and more.

See also
 List of Indonesians by net worth

References

External links
 Official website

2007 establishments in Indonesia
Business magazines
English-language magazines
Magazines published in Indonesia
Magazines established in 2007